Disney Mirrorverse is a 2022 mobile role-playing game developed and produced as a collaboration between Disney and Kabam. The crossover game was released on June 23, 2022, for iOS and Android. A teaser trailer for the game was released on March 23, 2022. The game is set in a fictional universe adjacent to other Disney canon, featuring dozens of familiar Disney, Pixar, and other characters from different franchises re-envisioned in a new storyline.

Gameplay 
Based on official teasers, gameplay involves quests and battles as the player navigates through a narrative storyline. Having the option for team-based play allows for various "combos" to utilize the unique strategies and abilities of different characters.

Characters 
Disney Mirrorverse includes a roster of more than 50 characters (including 3 non-playable characters), all from previously established franchises produced by The Walt Disney Company. Regardless of origin, each character has an art-style consistent with the theming of the game, and each character has an updated and alternate design to reflect their existence in an alternate universe, the Mirrorverse. Official art and promos have featured characters from animated classics such as Belle and Maleficent, characters from Pixar films such as Sulley and Buzz Lightyear, and even characters from other assorted franchises such as Jack Sparrow and Oogie Boogie. The game states that more characters will become playable in monthly events and future updates. All playable characters are teaming up to combat the corruptions of Fractured Magic in the Mirrorverse.

Reception 

Kabam soft-launched the game in the Philippines on April 14, 2020. First reactions to the game's teaser appear to be generally positive. As of June 10, 2022, Disney reported 1 million pre-registered players, maxing out their Milestone Rewards track.

Disney Mirrorverse received "mixed or average" reviews according to review aggregator Metacritic.

References 

2022 video games
Crossover role-playing video games
Disney video games
Video games about parallel universes
Multiplayer and single-player video games
IOS games
Android (operating system) games
Video games developed in Canada
Kabam games